As of Round 2 2022, a total of 269 players have played at least one senior game for the West Coast Eagles, an Australian rules football team in the Australian Football League.
A number of other players were listed (or are listed) with the club for periods of time without making their debut, some of whom played at senior level for other AFL teams.

West Coast Eagles players

1980s

1990s

2000s

2010s

2020s

Other players

Listed players yet to play a senior game for West Coast

Delisted players who did not play a senior game for West Coast

Notes

 For various reasons, a number of players drafted in the late 1980s and early 1990s refused to live in Western Australia, instead choosing to remain and play football in their home states.
 Inaugural squad member.

 Watson played 307 games with  before and after his drafting by West Coast.

See also
List of West Coast Eagles coaches

References

External links
AFL Tables: West Coast – All Time Player List
West Coast Eagles Past Players

West Coast Eagles

Players